Rocky IV: Original Motion Picture Soundtrack is the original motion picture soundtrack to the movie of the same name. It was released on November 27, 1985 on the Scotti Brothers label.

The soundtrack was hugely successful on the strength of two top-five singles, Survivor's "Burning Heart" (which Sylvester Stallone personally commissioned for the film and reached No. 2 on the Billboard Hot 100) and James Brown's "Living in America", as well as Robert Tepper's lone top-40 hit, "No Easy Way Out". It reached the top ten on the US Billboard 200 album chart and was certified Platinum by the RIAA.

It is the only score to a Rocky film not composed by Bill Conti, but does feature some music he composed for the first film.

Track listing

Re-releases and covers
The 2006 reissue, remastered by BMG, featured the bonus track "Man Against the World" by Survivor, a song written for but ultimately cut from the final movie tracklist. 

"Eye of the Tiger" was covered and partially sampled over 80 times

"No Easy Way Out" was covered multiple times by:

 Bullet for My Valentine — on their 2008 "Scream Aim Fire" album (as Bonus track for Japanese release)
 Eve To Adam — on their 2018 album "Ithaca"
 in 2019 they released a music video for this cover.
 Beast in Black — on their 2019 "From Hell with Love" album
 and other artists

Charts

Weekly charts

Year-end charts

Certifications

References

Rocky (film series) soundtracks
1985 soundtrack albums
1980s film soundtrack albums
Volcano Entertainment soundtracks
Scotti Brothers Records soundtracks
Intrada Records soundtracks